Frederick P. Cowan, Ph.D, was a health physicist and head of the Instrumentation and Health Physics Department at Brookhaven National Laboratory.

Cowan grew up in the Boston, Massachusetts area. He attended Bowdoin College, then went on to Harvard University to complete his Ph.D. After Harvard, Cowan went on to Rensselaer Polytechnic Institute to teach. During World War II Dr. Cowan worked in radar countermeasures. This was followed by a stint at the Chrysler Corporation and finally he ended up at Brookhaven National Laboratory to lead the Health Physics Division.

Select Publications
 Health Physics and Medical Aspects of a Strontium 90 Inhalation Incident
 Health Physics Program for the Brookhaven Cosmotron
 Radiation Safety in a Research Laboratory
 P32 Spill of April 23, 1957
 Bioassay Data and Analysis Relating to the P32 Spill of April 23, 1957
 A Preliminary Report on Health Physics Problems at the Brookhaven Alternating Gradient Synchrotron
 Personnel Dosimetry of Very-High Energy Radiations
 Some Dosimetry Problems of the Alternating Gradient Synchrotron (AGS)
 Health Physics Program for the Brookhaven National Laboratory Synchrotrons
 Health Physics Problems of High Energy Accelerators
 Everyday radiation

References

People from Boston
Health physicists
American physicists
Bowdoin College alumni
Harvard University alumni
Rensselaer Polytechnic Institute faculty
Chrysler people
Brookhaven National Laboratory staff
Health Physics Society
Year of birth missing
Year of death missing